Bern Dibner (18August 18976January 1988) was an electrical engineer, industrialist, and historian of science and technology. He originated two major US library collections in the history of science and technology.

Biography
Dibner was born in Lisianka, near Kiev, Ukraine in 1897. His family was Jewish. He moved to the United States with his family at the age of 7. In 1921, he graduated from the Polytechnic Institute of Brooklyn with a degree in Electrical Engineering.

Engineering career
Soon after graduating, Dibner designed and patented the first solderless electrical connectors and founded the Burndy Engineering Company in 1924.  The company later became the Burndy Corporation and was bought by the French corporation Framatome Connectors International (FCI) in 1988. In 2009, Burndy was acquired and became a subsidiary of Hubbell Incorporated.  Dibner died at his home in Wilton, Connecticut, on January 6, 1988.

The "Burndy" appellation, used for both his company and the library he would found, was represents a portmanteau or blend of his first and last names.

In 1954, Dibner was a board member of the American Jewish League Against Communism.

History of science 
In addition to electrical engineering, Dibner studied the history of technology.  He was an avid collector of original scientific works and of books on the history of science, as well as thousands of portraits of various scientists. Bern Dibner also wrote a great number of books on the history of science, such as The Atlantic Cable in 1955.  In 1976 he was awarded the Sarton Medal by the History of Science Society.

Dibner, who was fascinated by the combination of art and technology in the work of Leonardo da Vinci. He assembled a library of works about da Vinci which grew over the years as Dibner's interests expanded into the history of electricity, the history of Renaissance technology, and finally the history of science and technology in general.

Burndy Library
In 1941 Dibner formally established the Burndy Library as a separate institution "to advance scholarship in the history of science."   By 1964, the Burndy Library collection totaled over 40,000 volumes and Dibner opened a new building in Norwalk, Connecticut, to house the Library.

In 1974, Dibner donated one-quarter of the Burndy Library's holdings to the Smithsonian Institution to form the nucleus of a research library in the history of science and technology. It was located in the National Museum of History and Technology (now The National Museum of American History: Kenneth E. Behring Center). In 1976, the Smithsonian's  Dibner Library of the History of Science and Technology was established, providing the Smithsonian Institution Libraries with its first rare book collection, containing many of the major works dating from the fifteenth to the early nineteenth centuries in the history of science and technology including engineering, transportation, chemistry, mathematics, physics, electricity and astronomy.  The Smithsonian Dibner Library, then numbering 35,000 volumes, was reopened after construction in spring 2010, and is located in the National Museum of American History on the National Mall in Washington DC.  The Smithsonian Institution Libraries have cataloged the books and manuscripts of the Dibner Library and entered the records into the international database OCLC and the Smithsonian's own online catalog, SIRIS.

Death and commemoration
After Bern Dibner's death in 1988, the Burndy Library moved to Cambridge, Massachusetts, in 1992, where it became the research library for the Dibner Institute for the History of Science and Technology at the Massachusetts Institute of Technology.  In November 2006, the complete Burndy Library collection, by then consisting of 67,000 rare volumes and a collection of scientific instruments, was donated to and became part of the Huntington Library in San Marino, California, where it is available to scholars. The Huntington Library now offers a Dibner History of Science Program to fund fellowships, a lecture series and annual conference.

Publications 
 Leonardo da Vinci, Military Engineer (1946)
 Doctor William Gilbert (1947)
 Faraday Discloses Electro-magnetic Induction (1949)
 Moving the Obelisks (1950)
 Galvani-Volta, A Controversy that led to the Discovery of Useful Electricity (1952)
 Ten Founding Fathers of the Electrical Science (1954)
 Heralds of Science (1955)
 Early Electrical Machines (1957)
 Agricola on Metals (1958)
 The Atlantic Cable (1959)
 Darwin of the Beagle (1960)
 Oersted and the Discovery of Electromagnetism (1961)
 The Victoria and the Triton (1962)
 The New Rays of Prof. Röntgen (1963)
 Alessandro Volta and the Electric Battery (1964)
 Röntgen and the Discovery of X-rays (1968)
 Luigi Galvani (1971)
 Leonardo da Vinci, Machines and Weaponry (1974)
 Benjamin Franklin - Electrician (1976)
 The Burndy Library in Mitosis (1977)

See also 
 Burndy Engineering Company
 Burndy Library
 Dibner Institute for the History of Science and Technology
 Electrical Connector

References

External links
Biography of Bern Dibner at MIT
Biography of Bern Dibner at American Scientist
The Dibner Library Portrait Collection online at the Smithsonian Institution

1897 births
1988 deaths
American people of Ukrainian-Jewish descent
Ukrainian Jews
Jewish American historians
20th-century American engineers
People from Wilton, Connecticut
American historians of science
Historians of technology
Polytechnic Institute of New York University alumni
Engineers from Connecticut
Leonardo da Vinci Medal recipients
20th-century American historians
American male non-fiction writers
20th-century American male writers
Historians from Connecticut
20th-century American Jews